Skyline Landmark is a 36-story,  tall residential twin skyscrapers located in Linkou District, New Taipei City, Taiwan.  Built under strict requirements of preventing damage caused by earthquakes and typhoons common on the island, the complex provides 284 units of luxury apartments with facilities including an outdoor swimming pool, fitness center, garden, and karaoke room. When completed in 2014, the complex was the tallest in Linkou District. It held this title for six years until it was surpassed by Sunland 41 in 2020.

See also 
 List of tallest buildings in Taiwan
 List of tallest buildings in New Taipei City
 Linkou District
 Sunland 41

References

2014 establishments in Taiwan
Residential buildings completed in 2014
Residential skyscrapers in Taiwan
Skyscrapers in New Taipei
Twin towers
Apartment buildings in Taiwan